Guy-Michel Nisas is a Martiniquais professional football manager.

Career
Since 2007 until 2011 he coached the Martinique national football team.

References

Year of birth missing (living people)
Living people
Martiniquais football managers
Martinique national football team managers
Place of birth missing (living people)